Madison College was an educational institution in Uniontown, Pennsylvania operated by the Methodist Episcopal Church.

Henry Bidleman Bascom was the first president, 1827–29.  Bishop Matthew Simpson, who gave the funeral speech at Abraham Lincoln's funeral, was an alumnus.

References 

Defunct private universities and colleges in Pennsylvania
Universities and colleges in Fayette County, Pennsylvania